Goce is an opera composed by Kiril Makedonski (1925–1984), written by Venko Markovski and dedicated to Gotse Delchev. The work was commissioned to be the very first opera performed by the Macedonian National Opera Company. It premiered on May 24, 1954 and it is the first opera to be written in Macedonian.

See also
Music of North Macedonia

References

Operas
Macedonian-language operas
1954 operas